Konstantinogradovka is a rural locality (a selo) in Konstantinogradovsky Selsoviet of Ivanovsky District, Amur Oblast, Russia. The population was 525 as of 2018. There are 6 streets.

Geography 
Konstantinogradovka is located near the right bank of the Kozlovka River, 26 km southwest of Ivanovka (the district's administrative centre) by road. Yerkovtsy is the nearest rural locality.

References 

Rural localities in Ivanovsky District, Amur Oblast